Giorgio Bracardi (born 3 May 1935) is an Italian actor, composer and stand-up comedian.

Life and career 
Born in Rome, the older brother of the actor, pianist and composer Franco, for many years Bracardi worked around the world as a piano player (accompanying, among others, Maurice Chevalier and José Feliciano) and performing as an entertainer. He became famous in 1970, thanks to the radio variety show of Renzo Arbore and Gianni Boncompagni Alto gradimento ("High liking"), where he gave voice to some absurd and surreal characters such as Scarpantibus, Max Vinella, the Colonel Buttiglione and the hierarch Catenacci.  Later Bracardi created other grotesque and very original characters and appeared in numerous television shows. He starred in several movies, in some cases even as the leading actor. In 2008 he dubbed Cattivik in the eponymous animated series broadcast by Mediaset. He also composed and occasionally sang several songs.

References

External links 
 

1935 births
Living people
Italian male film actors
Italian television personalities
Italian radio personalities
Male actors from Rome
Italian comedians